In differential geometry, a Lie-algebra-valued form is a differential form with values in a Lie algebra. Such forms have important applications in the theory of connections on a principal bundle as well as in the theory of Cartan connections.

Formal definition 

Wedge product 

Since every Lie algebra has a bilinear Lie bracket operation, the wedge product of two Lie-algebra-valued forms can be composed with the bracket operation to obtain another Lie-algebra-valued form. For a -valued -form  and a -valued -form , their wedge product  is given by 

where the 's are tangent vectors. The notation is meant to indicate both operations involved.

The operation  can also be defined as the bilinear operation on  satisfying

Operations 
Let  be a Lie algebra homomorphism. If  is a -valued form on a manifold, then  is an -valued form on the same manifold obtained by applying  to the values of : .

Moreover, given a vector space , the same formula can be used to define the -valued form  when

Note that, when

and, conversely, any representation  determines  with the condition .

Explicitly,

With this notation, one has for example:
.

Forms with values in an adjoint bundle 

See also 
Maurer–Cartan form
Adjoint bundle

Notes

References

External links 
Wedge Product of Lie Algebra Valued One-Form
 

Differential forms
Lie algebras